This list of museums in Mississippi encompasses museums which are defined for this context as institutions (including nonprofit organizations, government entities, and private businesses) that collect and care for objects of cultural, artistic, scientific, or historical interest and make their collections or related exhibits available for public viewing. Museums that exist only in cyberspace (i.e., virtual museums) are not included.

Mississippi has a relatively large number of museums focused on Blues music (noted under "Music" in the type column of the table below).

The "Regions" column in the table refers to regional areas with boundaries used by the Mississippi Convention and Visitors Bureau (but with neutral names), as described in the "Regions" section below.

Museums

Defunct museums
 Graceland Too, Holly Springs, closed in 2014
International Checker Hall of Fame, Petal, destroyed by fire on September 29, 2007
 StenniSphere, closed in 2012, exhibits now in the INFINITY Science Center
 Walter Place Estate, Holly Springs, no longer a museum

Regions
The "Region" column of this list follows the regional divisions of the Mississippi Convention and Visitors Bureau, which breaks the state into these five areas (generic names here replace all but one of the bureau's names, which may have been designed for advertising purposes):
Delta ("Delta"): Bolivar, Carroll, Coahoma, Grenada, Holmes, Humphries, Issaqueena, Leflore, Montgomery, Quitman, Sharkey, Sunflower, Tallahachie, Tunica, Washington.
East central  ("Pines"): Attala, Clarke, Clay, Choctaw, Lauderdale, Leake, Lowndes, Neshoba, Newton, Oktibbeha, Kemper, Scott, Smith, Jasper, Webster
North ("Hills"): Alcorn, Benton, Calhoun, Chicksaw, DeSoto, Ittawamba,  Lafayette, Lee, Marshall, Monroe, Panola, Pontotoc, Prentiss, Tate, Tippah, Tishomingo, Union, Yalobusha.
Southeast  ("Coastal"): Covington, Forrest, George, Greene, Marion, Hancock, Harrison, Jackson, Jefferson Davis, Jones, Lamar, Pearl River, Perry, Stone, Wayne
Southwest  ("Capital/River"): Adams, Amite, Claiborne, Copah, Franklin, Jefferson, Lawrence, Lincoln, Madison, Pike, Rankin, Simpson, Walthall, Warren, Wilkinson, Yazoo

See also
 Botanical gardens in Mississippi (category)
 Nature Centers in Mississippi

Notes

Mississippi Museums Association

Museums
Mississippi
Museums